Talvisota may refer to:

Talvisota (film) or The Winter War, a 1989 Finnish film
Talvisota, a novel by Antti Tuuri, basis for the film
Talvisota: Icy Hell, a real-time action computer game
 "Talvisota", a song by Sabaton from The Art of War

See also
Suomen Talvisota 1939–1940, a Finnish rock band
Winter War (disambiguation)